The genus Cajanus is a member of the plant family Fabaceae. There are 37 species, mainly distributed across Africa, Asia and Australasia.

Species include the pigeon pea (C. cajan), which is a significant food crop.

Cajanus species are used as food plants by the larvae of some Lepidoptera species including Endoclita malabaricus.

Species include:
Cajanus acutifolius
Cajanus albicans
Cajanus aromaticus
Cajanus cajan - pigeon pea, Congo-pea
Cajanus cinereus
Cajanus confertiflorus
Cajanus crassicaulis
Cajanus crassus
Cajanus elongatus
Cajanus goensis
Cajanus grandiflorus
Cajanus kerstingii
Cajanus lanceolatus
Cajanus lanuginosus
Cajanus latisepalus
Cajanus mareebensis
Cajanus marmoratus
Cajanus mollis
Cajanus platycarpus
Cajanus pubescens
Cajanus reticulatus
Cajanus scarabaeoides
Cajanus sericeus
Cajanus viscidus

References

External links

Pigeon pea (archive link, was dead)

Phaseoleae
Fabaceae genera
Taxa named by Augustin Pyramus de Candolle